Probatiomimus is a genus of beetles in the family Cerambycidae, containing the following species:

 Probatiomimus eximius Melzer, 1934
 Probatiomimus melzeri Schwarzer, 1931
 Probatiomimus schwarzeri Melzer, 1926
 Probatiomimus signiferus (Thomson, 1865)
 Probatiomimus zellibori Monné, 1990

References

Acanthocinini